

Administrative and municipal divisions

References

Khabarovsk Krai
Khabarovsk Krai